Shawn Robinson (May 15, 1974 – July 28, 2015) was an American stuntman.

Biography
Robinson has performed stunts in a career spanning over 20 years, including films such as Guardians of the Galaxy, the Transformers film series, Hook, Behind Enemy Lines, War of the Worlds, Captain America: The Winter Soldier, and Horrible Bosses 2. In television, Robinson took part in episodes of Criminal Minds, Lost and NCIS: Los Angeles.

Personal life
Shawn was the son of legendary stuntman Dar Robinson.

Death
On July 28, 2015, Robinson was found dead in his hotel room in New Orleans, Louisiana after he failed to report for work on the film Deepwater Horizon. He was 41. Lionsgate released a statement in tribute to him, stating: 

Disney's live action remake of The Jungle Book was dedicated to his memory along with Garry Shandling .

References

External links 

1974 births
2015 deaths
American stunt performers